Lennart Klas Valdemar Klingström (18 April 1916 – 5 July 1994) was a Swedish sprint canoeist who competed in the late 1940s and early 1950s. He won the gold in the K-2 1000 m event at the 1948 Summer Olympics in London.

Klingström also won four medals at the ICF Canoe Sprint World Championships with three golds (K-1 4×500 m: 1948, 1950; K-4 1000 m: 1948) and a silver (K-1 500 m: 1950).

References

External links
 
 

1916 births
1994 deaths
Canoeists at the 1948 Summer Olympics
Olympic canoeists of Sweden
Olympic gold medalists for Sweden
Swedish male canoeists
Olympic medalists in canoeing
ICF Canoe Sprint World Championships medalists in kayak
Medalists at the 1948 Summer Olympics